The region have been inhabited  since the Stone Age. Copper tools from the Chalcolithic period have been discovered. This area entered the Iron Age during the mid-2nd millennium BCE.

The region was conquered by the Maurya Empire and later (17th century) came under the control of the Mughal emperors Akbar. Following the Mughal decline, the region came under the control of local rulers from the Chero caste and others, before its subjugation by the British East India Company in the late 18th century, succeeded by the British Raj from the mid-19th century, both encountering much local resistance. At this time the territory was covered by nine princely states. Under the Raj, till 1905, the region fell within the Bengal Presidency, most of it then being transferred to the Central Provinces and Orissa Tributary States; then in 1936 the whole region was assigned to the Eastern States Agency.

Following Indian independence in 1947, the region was divided between the new states of Madhya Pradesh, Orissa, and Bihar. In 2000 a campaign led by the BJP for a separate state culminated with the passage of the Bihar Reorganisation Act, creating Jharkhand as a new Indian state.

Prehistoric era
Stone tools and microliths from the Mesolithic and Neolithic periods have been discovered in the Chota Nagpur Plateau region. There are also ancient cave paintings in Isko, Hazaribagh district which are from the Meso-Chalcolithic period (9,000–5,000 BC). A group of megaliths proven to date back to beyond 3000 BCE was also found at Barkagaon, about 25 km from Hazaribagh at Punkri Barwadih.

During 2nd millennium BCE the use of Copper tools spread in Chota Nagpur Plateau and these find complex are known as the Copper Hoard Culture. In the Kabra-Kala mound, at the confluence of the Son and North Koel rivers in Palamu district, various objects have been found which date from the Neolithic to the medieval period. The pot-sherds of redware, black and red ware, black ware, black slipware and NBP ware are from the Chalcolithic to the late medieval period.

Ancient period

Barudih, located in the Singhbhum district of Jharkhand, yielded evidence of microliths, Neolithic celts, iron slags, wheel made pottery, and iron objects (including a sickle). The earliest radio carbon dating give a range of 1401–837 BCE for this site.

Around –1000 BCE, Vedic Aryans spread eastward to the fertile western Ganges plain and adopted iron tools, which allowed for the clearing of forest and the adoption of a more settled, agricultural way of life. During this time, the central Ganges Plain was dominated by a related but non-Vedic Indo-Aryan culture. The end of the Vedic period witnessed the rise of cities and large states (called mahajanapadas), as well as śramaṇa movements (including Jainism and Buddhism) which challenged the Vedic orthodoxy of Brahminical Hinduism. According to Bronkhorst, the Sramana culture arose in "greater Magadha," which was Indo-European, but not Vedic. In this culture, Kshatriyas were placed higher than Brahmins, and it rejected Vedic authority and rituals. 

In Mahabharata, the region was referred as Kark Khand due to its location near Tropic of Cancer. 
In those days, the Jharkhand state was a part of Magadha and Anga.  Nanda Empire ruled the region during 4th century BCE. In Mauryan period, this region was ruled by a number of states, which were collectively known as the Atavika (forest) states. These conquered states fell under the hegemony of the Maurya empire during Ashoka's expansionist reign (c. 232 BCE). The Brahmi Inscription found in Karbakala in Palamu district and Saridkel in Khunti district which is from 3rd century BCE.
In ancient site of Saridkel, burnt bricks houses, red ware pottery, copper tools, coins and iron tools were found which belong to early centuries CE.

Samudragupta, while marching through the present-day Chota Nagpur region (North and South), directed the first attack against the kingdom of Dakshina Kosala in the Mahanadi valley.

Medieval period
In the 7th century, Chinese traveler Xuanzang passed through the region. He described the kingdom as Karnasuvarna and Shashanka as its ruler. To the north of the kingdom was Magadha, Champa was in East, Mahendra in the west, and Orissa in the south. The region was also part of Pala Empire. A Buddhist monastery has been discovered in Hazaribagh which was built during Pala rule in 10th century. Bhim Karn was Nagvanshi king during medieval period. He defeated Raksel dynasty of Surguja when they Invaded the reign with cavalry.

Modern period
By the end of medieval and the beginning of the modern period, this region was under the rule of many dynasties including Nagvanshi, Khayaravala, Ramgarh Raj, Raksel, Chero, Raj Dhanwar and the Kharagdiha Zamindari estates of Koderma, Gadi Palganj, and Ledo Gadi.

In Akbarnama, the region of Chota Nagpur is described as Jharkhand. During the Mughal period, the region, then known as Khukhra, was famous for its diamonds. Akbar was informed of a rebel Afghan sardar, Junaid Kararani, whose hideout was Chota Nagpur. The Emperor also received information on diamonds being found in this area. Consequently, Akbar ordered Shahbaz Khan Kamboh to attack Khukhra. At that time, Raja Madhu Singh, the 42nd Nagvanshi king was ruling at Khukhra. Akbar's army defeated the king and a sum of rupees six thousand was fixed as its annual revenue payable to the Mughals. Till the reign of Akbar, Chota Nagpur had not come under the suzerainty of the Mughals and the Nagvanshi rulers had been ruling over this region as independent rulers.

By the advent of the reign of Emperor Jahangir, king Durjan Shah had come to power in Chota Nagpur. He refused to pay the annual revenue fixed by Akbar. Jahangir ordered Ibrahim Khan (governor of Bihar) to attack Khukhra. Jahangir's intentions were two-pronged: defeat Durjan Shah and acquire the diamonds found in the Sankh River. In 1615 AD, Ibrahim Khan marched against Khukhra and defeated Durjan Shah, took him as a captive to Patna, and was finally imprisoned in the Gwalior fort. The imprisonment lasted for twelve years. Ultimately, Jahangir granted his release after realising Sal's skill of distinguishing real diamonds. The title of Shah was conferred on him by Emperor Jahangir and his kingdom restored. Durjan Shah shifted the capital from Khukhragarh to Doisa, also known as Navratangarh. The reign of Durjan Sal lasted for about thirteen years. He died in 1639 or 1640 AD. He was succeeded by King Ram Shah ruled from 1640 to 1663. He built Kapilnath Temple in 1643. He succeeded by his son Raghunath Shah. Thakur Ani Nath Shahdeo bulit Jagannath temple of Ranchi in 1991. 

In Palamu district, the old fort in the plains, was built by the King of Raksel Rajput Dynasty. However, it was during the reign of King Medini Ray (1658–1674), who ruled from 1658 to 1674 in Palamau, the old fort was rebuilt into a defensive structure. His rule extended to areas in South Gaya and Hazaribagh. He attacked Navratangarh ( and defeated it. With the war bounty, he constructed the lower fort close to Satbarwa. Following the death of Medini Ray, there was rivalry within the royal family of the Chero dynasty which ultimately led to its downfall; this was engineered by the ministers and advisers in the court.

Daud Khan, who launched his invasion on 3 April 1660 from Patna, attacked south of Gaya district and finally arrived at the Palamu forts on 9 December 1660. The terms of surrender and payment of tribute were not acceptable to the Cheros; Daud Khan apparently wanted complete conversion of the Hindus to Islam. Following this, Khan mounted a series of attacks on the forts. Cheros defended the forts but ultimately lost and fled to the jungles. The temples were destroyed and Mughal rule was re-imposed.

In 1765, the region came under the control of the British East India Company when Chitrajeet Rai's nephew, Gopal Rai, betrayed him and facilitated the Patna council of the East India Company to attack the fort. When the new fort was attacked by Captain Camac on 28 January 1771, the Chero soldiers fought valiantly but had to retreat to the old fort on account of water shortage. This helped the British army to occupy the new fort located on a hill without any struggle. The location was strategic and enabled the British to mount cannon-supported attacks on the old fort. The Cheros fought valiantly with their own cannons but the old fort was besieged by the British on 19 March 1771. The fort was finally occupied by the British in 1772. The regions of Nagvansh and Ramgarh also became parts of British Raj.

The Kharagdiha kingdom, which was founded in 15th century when the Maharaja of Bhumihar clan was able to influence and impress the ghatwals of Kharagdiha Gadis, also came under the British Raj. After the Treaty of Allahabad, this region, along with the rest of Suba Bengal, came under the rule of East India Company. The kingdom was considerably reduced. In 1809, the Maharajas of Kharagdiha became the Rajas of Dhanwar. The Kharagdiha gadis were semi-independent chiefdoms. Captain Camac found the rulers of these gadis very prominent in their chiefdoms, and as a result, these gadis were permanently settled as zamindari estates. Koderma, Gadi Palganj and Ledo Gadi were notable zamindari estates in the district.

Other princely states in the Chota Nagpur Plateau came within the sphere of influence of the Maratha Empire, but they became tributary states of East India Company as a result of the Anglo-Maratha Wars known as Chota Nagpur Tributary States.

Colonial era
1766–1809: Chuar revolt by the Bhumij zamindars of Jungle Mahals, led by Jagannath Singh.
1767–1777: Dhal revolt by Raja Jagannath Dhal of Dhalbhum.
1769–1778: Revolt led by Raghunath Mahato  in 1769.
1772–1780: Paharia revolt
1780–1785: Tilka Manjhi led the tribal revolt and managed to injure the collector of Bhagalpur, Augustus Cleveland, who died in Cape Town later. In 1785, Tilka Manjhi was hanged to death in Bhagalpur.
1795–1800: Tamar revolt
1795–1800: Munda revolt under the leadership of Vishnu Manaki
1800–1802: Munda revolt under the stewardship of Dukhan Manaki of Tamar
1812: Bakhtar Say and Mundal Singh rebelled against British East India company in Gumla.
1819–1820: Chero revolt in Palamu under the leadership of Bhukan Singh
1831–1832: Kol revolt under the leadership of Buddhu Bhagat, Madara Bhagat, and Joe Bhagat
1832–1833: Bhumij revolt under the leadership of Ganga Narayan Singh of Birbhum
1855: Santhals revolt against the revenue of Lord Cornwallis

1855–1860: During the late 1850s, Sidhu had accumulated about ten thousand Santhal to run a parallel government against British rule. The basic purpose was to collect taxes by making his own laws. British Government had announced an award of Rs. 10,000 to arrest Sidhu and his brother Kanhu betrayed. 
1856–1857: Martyr Sahid Lal, Thakur Vishwanath Shahdeo, Pandey Ganpat Rai, Tikait Umrao Singh, Sheikh Bhikhari, Nadir Ali, Jai Mangal Singh  led a movement against the British Government during India's First War of Independence, 1857, also called Sepoy Mutiny.
Nilambar and Pitambar led a revolt against East India company in 1857.
1868: Kharwar revolt under the leadership of Bhagirath, Dubai Gosai, and Patel Singh

After the Indian Rebellion of 1857, the rule of the British East India Company was transferred to the Crown in the person of Queen Victoria, who, in 1876, was proclaimed Empress of India. In 1874, the Kherwar Movement under the leadership of Bhagirathi Manjhi gained prominence. The Cheros and Kharwars again rebelled against the British in 1882 but the attack was repulsed. Between 1895 and 1900, a movement against the British Raj was led by Birsa Munda (born 15 November 1875).  Birsa Munda was captured by British forces and declared dead on 9 June 1900 in the Ranchi Jail, due to Cholera, according to records of the British colonial government. All of these uprisings were quelled by the British through massive deployment of troops across the region.

In 1914, the Tana Bhagat resistance movement started, which gained the participation of more than 26,000 Adivasis, and eventually merged with Mahatma Gandhi's Satyagraha and Civil Disobedience movement.

In October 1905, the exercise of British influence over the predominantly Hindi-speaking states of Chang Bhakar, Jashpur, Koriya, Surguja, and Udaipur was transferred from the Bengal government to that of the Central Provinces, while the two Oriya-speaking states of Gangpur and Bonai were attached to the Orissa Tributary States, leaving only Kharsawan and Saraikela answerable to the Bengal governor.

In 1936, all nine states were transferred to the Eastern States Agency, the officials of which came under the direct authority of the Governor-General of India, rather than under that of any Provinces.

In March 1940, INC 53rd Session was accomplished under the presidency of Maulana Abul Qalam Azad at Jhanda Chowk, Ramgarh (now, Ramgarh Cant.). Mahatma Gandhi, Jawaharlal Nehru, Sardar Patel, Dr. Rajendra Prasad, Sarojini Naidu, Khan Abdul Ghaffar Khan, Acharya J.B. Kripalani, Industrialist Jamnalal Bajaj and other leaders of Indian freedom movement attended the Ramgarh session. Mahatma Gandhi also opened khadi and village industries exhibition at Ramgarh.

Post-independence
After the Indian independence in 1947, the rulers of the states chose to accede to the Dominion of India. Changbhakar, Jashpur, Koriya, Surguja, and Udaipur States became part of Madhya Pradesh state; Gangpur and Bonai became part of Orissa state; and Kharsawan and Saraikela became part of Bihar state.

In 1928, Unnati Samaj, the political wing of Christian tribals submitted a memorandum to the Simon Commission to constitute a tribal state in Eastern India. A prominent leader like Jaipal Singh Munda and Ram Narayan Singh demanded a separate state. In 1955, Jharkhand Party, led by Jaipal Singh Munda, submitted a memorandum to States Reorganization Commission for Jharkhand state for tribals, but it was rejected because the region had different languages, the tribals were in minority, Hindustani was majority language and adverse effect on economy of Bihar.

Later Sadan people, the native various caste groups also joined the movement for separate state which strengthen the movement. In 1972, Binod Bihari Mahato, Shibu Soren and A. K. Roy founded Jharkhand Mukti Morcha (JMM). Nirmal Mahto founded All Jharkhand Students Union (AJSU). They spearheaded the movement for a separate state of Jharkhand. The Jharkhand coordination committee (JCC) led by Ram Dayal Munda, Dr. B.P. Keshri, Binod Bihari Mahato, Santosh Rana, and Suraj Singh Besra started a fresh initiative in the matter. It try to coordinate between different parties. Dr. B.P. Keshri sent a memorandum to form Jharkhand state in 1988. 

In July 1988, Bharatiya Janata party in the leadership of Atal Bihari Vajpayee, Lal Krishna Advani and Murli Manohar Joshi decided to demand separate state Vanachal composed of forest region of South Bihar in Jamshedpur. Inder Singh Namdhari, 
Samresh Singh and Rudra Pratap Sarangi were prominent leader of Vanachal movement. They organised several rallies to form a separate state Vanachal.
The Centre government formed a committee on the Jharkhand matter in 1989. It stressed the need for greater allocation of the development funds for the area. JMM wanted greater representation and AJSU was against it.  Due to differences, these parties parted away from each other. There was a provision for limited internal autonomy in the hill area of Assam. Other tribal areas were covered by the fifth schedule of the constitution. The Chota Nagpur and Santal Pargana development board was constituted under the chairmanship of then Chief Minister of Bihar under the provision of the fifth schedule in 1972. AJSU introduced elements of violence in the movement and called for a boycott of the election while JMM opposed it. Jharkhand Area Autonomous Council Bill passed in Bihar legislative assembly in December 1994. Jharkhand Area Autonomous Council was given the charge of 40 subjects including agriculture, rural health, public work, public health, and minerals. The council had the power to recommend legislation to the Assembly through the state government and to frame bylaws and regulations.

In 1998, when the separate state movement was falling apart, Justice Lal Pingley Nath Shahdeo had led the movement. In 1998, the Union government decided to send the Bill concerning formation of Jharkhand State to Bihar Legislative Assembly to which Lalu Prasad Yadav had said that the State would be divided over his dead body. BJP, JMM, AJSU, Congress, a total of 16 political parties came in one platform and formed 'All Party Separate State Formation Committee' to start the movement. Justice Shahdeo was elected as the convener of the committee. The voting on Jharkhand Act was to be done on 21 September 1998 in Bihar legislation. On that day the committee, under the leadership of Justice Shahdeo called for Jharkhand Bandh and organised a protest march. Thousands of supporters of separate state took to streets in leadership of Justice Shahdeo. He was arrested and detained in police station for hours along with many supporters.

In 1999, Bharatiya Janata party, promised to form separate state Vanachal, if BJP win the state election and BJP get majority of votes.
After the last Assembly election in the state resulted in a hung assembly, RJD's dependence on the Congress extended support on the precondition that RJD would not pose a hurdle to the passage of the Bihar reorganisation bill . Finally, with the support from both RJD and Congress, the ruling coalition at the Centre led by the BJP which had made statehood a policy plank in the region in several previous elections, cleared the Bihar Reorganisation Act in the monsoon session of the Parliament in 2000, thus paving the way for the creation of a separate Vanachal state comprising Chota Nagpur Division and Santhal Pargana Division of South Bihar. NDA formed the government with Babulal Marandi as chief minister. Later it was renamed as Jharkhand.

See also 
 List of Monuments of National Importance in Jharkhand

References

Works cited